Gone Wanderin' is the debut studio album released by Jackie Greene.

Track listing
All songs written by Jackie Greene except where indicated.

"Gone Wanderin'" – 2:55
"Tell Me Mama, Tell Me Right" – 2:36
"Travelin' Song" – 3:57
"Mexican Girl" – 4:02
"Down in the Valley Woe" – 4:22
"Cry Yourself Dry" – 4:27
"By the Side of the Road, Dressed to Kill" – 4:18
"Freeport Boulevard" – 3:17
"Judgement Day" – 2:52
"Gracie" – 4:33
"Maria, Maria (It's a Sin to Tell a Lie)" – 2:48
"The Ballad of Sleepy John" – 5:07
"Messin' with the Kid" (Live, with Mick Martin & The Blues Rockers) (Mel London) – 4:39

References

Jackie Greene albums
2002 debut albums